Ainars Baštiks (born October 26, 1958, Liepāja) is a Latvian politician and a Baptist pastor. He is a member of the LPP/LC party.

References

External links
Centrālā vēlēšanu komisija

1958 births
Living people
Politicians from Liepāja
Latvian Baptists
Latvia's First Party politicians
Latvia's First Party/Latvian Way politicians
Honor to serve Riga politicians
Government ministers of Latvia
Deputies of the 8th Saeima
Deputies of the 9th Saeima
University of Latvia alumni